Robert Johnson is an American former Negro league first baseman who played in the 1940s.

Johnson played for the Kansas City Monarchs in 1944. In six recorded games, he posted two hits in 17 plate appearances.

References

External links
 and Seamheads

Year of birth missing
Place of birth missing
Kansas City Monarchs players